Porédaka  is a town and sub-prefecture in the Mamou Prefecture in the Mamou Region of Guinea. The Battle of Porédaka took place here on 13 November 1896, during which French colonial troops decisively defeated the last forces of the Imamate of Futa Jallon, after which Futa Jallon was annexed into Senegambia.

Notable people
 
 
Dr. Boubacar Diallo Telli (1925 – February 1977) –  Diplomat and Politician. First Secretary-General of the Organization of African Unity (OAU),UN Representative, Ambassador to USA, Minister of Justice
Dr. Tierno Monénembo (real name Thierno Saidou Diallo) – Doctorate in biochemistry. Professor and novelist, winner of the Prix Renaudot award in 2008 for his novel The King of Kahel, winner of Grand Prix de la Francophonie 2017.
Mohamed Béavogui (Toma/Fulani)- Prime Minister of Guinea

References

Sub-prefectures of the Mamou Region